The Conservative Party ( Hizb Al-Mohafezeen) is a political party in Egypt. The party was founded by Mostafa Abdel Aziz, a writer and journalist. In its foundation the party included many notable Egyptian journalists and public figures. The current leader, Akmal Kertam, was an influential member of the National Democratic Party. The party froze all activities in 2010, as a rejection of the political and security laws that were forced upon other political parties in that era by the former Mubarak regime, as well as due to the low funding it had. Yet after the 2011 Egyptian revolution, and with new free laws for political activity, the party notified governmental institutions that it would be active once again. The party is part of the political Egyptian opposition.

References

External links
The Conservative Party on Egypt State Information Service (SIS)

2006 establishments in Egypt
Conservative parties in Egypt
Political parties established in 2006
Political parties in Egypt